Fig is an unincorporated community in Ashe County, North Carolina, United States, southwest of Clifton. It lies at an elevation of 2,802 feet (854 m).

History
A post office called Fig was established in 1888 and remained in operation until it was discontinued in 1969. The community was named for the common fig.

References

Unincorporated communities in Ashe County, North Carolina
Unincorporated communities in North Carolina